Senthi Kumari is an Indian actress known for her role in the film Pasanga and the third season of Saravanan Meenatchi and Vanathai Pola as Chellathayi. She played the mother of one of Nayanthara's characters in Airaa (2019). She acted in more than 200 films in small roles and some films in important supporting roles .

Filmography

Television

References

External links

Living people
Indian film actresses
21st-century Indian actresses
Actresses in Tamil cinema
Actresses in Tamil television
Actresses from Madurai
1979 births